Kosiński uprising (1591–1593) is a name applied to two rebellions in the Polish–Lithuanian Commonwealth (modern-day Ukraine) organised by Krzysztof Kosiński against the local Ruthenian nobility and magnates.

In the late 16th century the Polish–Lithuanian Commonwealth was experiencing a short period of internal stability. This, however, was threatened by the Cossacks, who organised raids into Crimea, Moldavia, and other lands of the Ottoman Empire. To counter the threat, Sultan Murad III threatened Poland–Lithuania with war if the Cossack pillaging was to continue. In 1580 the Sejm in Warsaw passed the Order in Ukraine (Porządek ze strony Niżowców i Ukrainy) Act, in which the Registered Cossacks were banned from raids to the Zaporizhian Sich, taking captives and pillaging. Any Cossack who broke this law was to be put to death without trial.

In 1591 Kosiński, who was at that time one of the colonels of the Registered Cossacks in Kiev Voivodship, was deprived of his estate in the villages of Rokitno and Olszanice by the Ostrogski family. To take his lands back, Kosiński gathered his regiment and captured the castle of Bila Tserkva. There he named himself a Hetman of Cossacks and started a revolt against Polish rule in Ukraine and the rule of local Ruthenian nobility and magnates in the lands of Kiev and Bratslav.

What started as a private act of revenge soon turned into a full-scale civil war between local Ruthenian nobility and the Cossacks. By 1592 a large part of the society of Ukraine supported the revolt and it spread to Volhynia. However, the conflict was seen by Polish hetman and chancellor Jan Zamoyski as yet another struggle for power in Ukraine and the Polish forces of hetman Stanisław Żółkiewski did not enter the war. The local nobles started a levee en masse and with their own private forces began a pursuit of Kosiński's forces.

The two armies clashed near the village of Piątek on 2 February 1593. After a short fight, the forces of the Cossacks were defeated by Duke Konstanty Wasyl Ostrogski. In what became known as the Battle of Piątek, Kosiński himself was taken, prisoner. He promised to obey the orders of the Hetmans of the Crown and the rebellion ended.

However, the following year he broke his promise and escaped to Zaporizhia, where he started to organise yet another Cossack army. Moreover, on 13 May 1593 he signed a document in which he subjected Ukraine to Muscovite tsar Feodor I. Soon afterward he gathered approximately 2000 men and began a fast march towards the seat of the starost of Cherkasy. Local nobility organised a strong defence composed mainly of their private forces. Little is known of the fate of the campaign. According to Aleksander Wiśniowiecki, Kosiński was killed in a battle against his forces, while the chronicle of Marcin Bielski mentions that Kosiński was found drunk in a guest house and killed in a duel.

In the spring of 1593, the Sejm passed a revised Of Niżowcy (O Niżowcach) Act, in which it declared all the remaining forces of Kosiński guilty of high treason and sentenced them to death. The remaining Cossack forces signed an agreement in August of the same year in which the Registered Cossacks could return home with their arms and boats as well as amnesty in exchange for their loyalty.

See also
 Nalyvaiko Uprising
 Polish–Lithuanian Commonwealth

1591 in the Polish–Lithuanian Commonwealth
1592 in the Polish–Lithuanian Commonwealth
1593 in the Polish–Lithuanian Commonwealth
Conflicts in 1591
Conflicts in 1592
Conflicts in 1593
16th-century rebellions
16th century in Ukraine
Cossack uprisings
Wars involving Poland
Warfare of the Early Modern period
Rebellions in the Polish–Lithuanian Commonwealth
Military history of Ukraine